Colletotrichum fragariae is a fungal plant pathogen infecting strawberries. It is not a well known fungus, and there are many similar fungi that are related to it. It is part of the Colletotrichum genus. It is a pathogen that occurs in strawberries. It leads to the disease known as anthracnose. This is typically at the crown of the strawberry, which is why it is often called crown rot. It is also known as the Anthracnose Crown rot. The fungus also infects leaves and is known as leaf spot, which is common among all Colletotrichum. This is not as common in the fragariae, as it is more common in the crown. This fungus is also better at infecting younger strawberries/seedlings. The most common way to control this disease is fungicides that are harmful to the environment. There have been studies done to see if the fungus infects other hosts but other than some weeds, it is very specific to Strawberries.

The occurrence of this fungus in strawberries fluctuates, and data can be found here. It is one of the more deadly pathogens to the strawberry, as once it is inside and affects the crown, the strawberry is no longer able to reproduce or be consumed. For some pictures, this website has some to show what the disease does.

Morphology 
The Colletotrichum fragariae is a very small, microscopic pathogen. It can be seen under microscopes. In a study by A.N. Brooks, the pathogen had tapering to the base, was about 24 x 4.5 µm, had 3-5 septate, but up to 9. It did occur in fascicles, sometimes sinuous, brown, apical cell hyaline or light brown. The apical cell tapers to an open, truncate apex, apical cells of mature setae functioning as phialides and producing conidia (Brooks, 1931). It also produces cylindrical conidia. There is no above ground body or fruiting body that this fungi makes.

Ecology 
The Colletotrichum fragariae is found in Subtropical/Tropical Moist Lowland Forest and Montane Forests. It had been found in both North and South America and even Asia. There are 66 records of this species in 5 countries. 85% of those were found in the US. It has been researched and found that high soil fertility increases the ability for this fungus to grow. There has been many research papers done to see what the fungus prefers and how it does in certain environments.

Reproduction 
The Colletotrichum fragariae is a smaller fungus. It reproduces through asexual spores. This is true among all Colletotrichum genus fungi. There are a couple different growth stages including: Flowering stage, Fruiting stage, Post-harvest, Seedling stage, and Vegetative growing stage

See also
 List of strawberry diseases

References

External links
 https://www.cabi.org/isc/datasheet/14907
 http://iucn.ekoo.se/iucn/species_view/265244/
 https://www.cabi.org/isc/abstract/19901144197
 https://www.researchgate.net/publication/249305342_Colletotrichum_fragariae_Is_a_Pathogen_on_Hosts_Other_Than_Strawberry
 https://digitalcommons.lsu.edu/cgi/viewcontent.cgi?article=5107&context=gradschool_disstheses
 https://www.plantwise.org/knowledgebank/datasheet/14907
 https://www.frontiersin.org/articles/10.3389/fmicb.2021.735732/full
 https://journals.ashs.org/hortsci/view/journals/hortsci/43/1/article-p69.xml
 http://www.speciesfungorum.org/Names/NamesRecord.asp?RecordID=265244
 https://agrobaseapp.com/canada/disease/anthracnose-of-strawberries

fragariae
Fungal strawberry diseases
Fungi described in 1931